Alenia is an Afrotropical genus of skippers in the family Hesperiidae.

Species
Alenia namaqua Vári, 1974
Alenia sandaster (Trimen, 1868)

References
Natural History Museum Lepidoptera genus database

External links
Alenia at funet

Celaenorrhinini
Hesperiidae genera
Taxa named by William Harry Evans